The Third Federal Electoral District of Baja California (III Distrito Electoral Federal de Baja California) is one of the 300 Electoral Districts in Mexico, and one of eight such districts in the state of Baja California. The Federal Electoral Districts elect the federal Chamber of Deputies. It covers the southern section of the Baja California Peninsula, with the coastal city of Ensenada representing a major population center. The Third District's constituency is the largest in the state.

During each three-year legislative period, the district elects one deputy to the lower house of Congress using the first past the post system.

Geography 
Between 1996 and 2005, this district's territory was made up entirely by the municipalities of Ensenada, Tecate, and Playas de Rosarito.

Deputies

References

See also 

 Federal electoral districts of Mexico

Federal electoral districts of Mexico
Baja California